Ruth C. Williams (1897-1982) was an Australian writer for children who was born in London England. In 1950, she received the Children's Book of the Year Award: Older Readers for Verity of Sydney Town.

She was married to Australian landscape artist Rhys Williams, who illustrated each of her books.

Bibliography

Children's fiction 
 Pirate's Gold (1945) illustrated by Rhys Williams
 Our Friend Rodney (1945) illustrated by Rhys Williams
 Timothy Tatters (1947) illustrated by Rhys Williams
 Verity of Sydney Town (1950) illustrated by Rhys Williams

Children's verse 
 The Adventures of Georgie Grub (1946) illustrated by Rhys Williams
 More Adventures of Georgie Grub (1946) illustrated by Rhys Williams

Non-fiction 
 The Aboriginal Story (1955) illustrated by Rhys Williams

Awards and nominations 
 1950 - winner Children's Book of the Year Award: Older Readers for Verity of Sydney Town

References

20th-century Australian novelists
Australian women novelists
1897 births
1962 deaths
20th-century Australian women writers